The 2014 PDC Unicorn World Youth Championship was the fourth edition of the PDC World Youth Championship, a tournament organised by the Professional Darts Corporation for darts players aged between 16 and 21.

The knock-out stages from the last 64 to the semi-finals were played in Reading on 5 April 2014. The final took place on 22 May 2014, before the final of the 2014 Premier League Darts, which was shown live on Sky Sports.

2013 champion Michael Smith was not eligible to defend his title. Keegan Brown and Rowby-John Rodriguez contested the final at The O2 Arena, London, with Brown winning 6–4.

Prize money

Qualification
The tournament featured 64 players. The top 50 players in the PDC Challenge Tour Order of Merit automatically qualified for the tournament, with the top eight players being seeded. They were joined by 14 international qualifiers. Three players withdrew prior to the tournament, so their places were awarded through an open qualifier, which took place on 4 April.

The participants were:

1-50

International qualifiers
  Amit Gilitwala 
  Fredi Gselmann
  Tyson Hoefel
  Robbie King
  Aaron Knox
  Dan Lauby Jr
  Steve Lennon
  Vincenzo Masciarelli
  Shaun Narain
  Eric Pedley
  Andrew Ryan
  Martin Schindler
  Justin Webers
  Mike Zuydwijk
Open Qualifiers
  Rees Hall
  Dean Reynolds
  Cain Unwin

Draw

References

World Youth Championship
PDC World Youth Championship
PDC World Youth Championship
PDC World Youth Championship
2014